Hitier is a French surname. Notable people with the surname include:

Henri Hitier (1864–1958), French agronomist
Jacques Hitier (1917–1999), French interior architect and designer

See also
Hitler (name)

French-language surnames